Robert Lanham (born 1971 in Richmond, Virginia) is the author of the satiric books The Hipster Handbook, Food Court Druids, Cherohonkees, and Other Creatures Unique to the Republic, and The Sinner's Guide to the Evangelical Right. He coined the term idiosyncrology, the study of idiosyncratic people, and his books often parody the eccentric people one finds in the United States. Neal Pollack calls Lanham "the Margaret Mead of the North American weirdo." In an article published in the fall of 2009, referred to Lanham as one of "Five Voices That Matter in the Music Blogosphere."

Lanham is also the editor of FREEwilliamsburg, a website covering the arts and culture of the artist mecca Williamsburg, Brooklyn. His writing has appeared in The New York Times, The Independent, The Washington Post, Time Out, Huffington Post, Maxim, Salon, Nylon, Radar, McSweeney's, Gawker and Playboy, as well as in the collections The Subway Chronicles, Cassette From My Ex, Rock & Roll Cage Match, and Bookmark Now. Lanham lives in Brooklyn, New York.

Notes

References
 Your Life: Highly Classified, By Robert Lanham, Washington Post article
 The Good, the Bad and the Frado, New York Times Hipster Handbook article
 Five Voices That Matter in the Music Blogosphere, New York Magazine
 Brand Name Blogs, New York Magazine article discussing Lanham's blog
 Ethics Daily on Robert Lanham
 Why Blog? Reason No. 92: Book Deal, New York Times
 Blog Books Go for Broke, Newsweek

External links
Robert Lanham's author website

American satirists
American humorists
American online publication editors
Writers from New York (state)
Writers from Richmond, Virginia
People from Brooklyn
1971 births
Living people
Journalists from New York City
Comedians from New York (state)
21st-century American comedians